Cuiciuna iuati is a species of beetle in the family Cerambycidae. It was described by Galileo and Martins in 1997. It is known from Brazil.

References

Hemilophini
Beetles described in 1997